The 1979 New York Giants season was the franchise's 55th season in the National Football League (NFL). The Giants had a 6–10 record in 1979 and finished in fourth place in the National Football Conference East Division.

The Giants were one of three franchises, not including the Seattle Seahawks (an expansion team that began play in 1976), which did not make the playoffs during any year of the 1970s. The others were the New York Jets and New Orleans Saints.

Offseason 
Before the 1979 NFL Draft, Bill Walsh, who was the new coach of the San Francisco 49ers, flew to Morehead State University with assistant coach Sam Wyche to work out quarterback Phil Simms. Walsh was so impressed with him that he planned to draft Simms, actually preferring him over another young quarterback they scouted and ultimately drafted, Joe Montana. The Giants, however, decided to make Simms their first-round pick to the surprise of many. As Simms acknowledged, "most people have never heard of me." When Simms' name was announced by Commissioner Pete Rozelle, his selection was booed loudly by Giants fans. However, he became more popular with his teammates, who jokingly dubbed him "Prince Valiant" in his rookie training camp.

Draft

Personnel

Staff

Roster

Regular season 
Simms won his first four starts in his rookie year. He led the team to a 6–4 record as a starter, throwing for 1,743 yards and 13 touchdown passes, and was named to the NFL All Rookie Team. According to his 1981 Topps trading card, he was runner-up in 1979 for Rookie of the Year, losing out to future teammate Ottis Anderson.

Schedule 

Note: Intra-division opponents are in bold text.

Game summaries

Week 6

Standings

See also 
 1979 NFL season

References 

New York Giants seasons
New York Giants
New York Giants
20th century in East Rutherford, New Jersey
Meadowlands Sports Complex